Splash! is a reality television show which teaches celebrities the art of diving. The first series is featured to start on 11 June 2013, and it will be broadcast by Telefe. Marley Wiebe will be hosting the show, with Pampita Ardohain, Maximiliano Guerra, Miguel Ángel Rodríguez and Mariana Montes as judges.

Origins and history
Splash has its origin and idea from German TV Olympic-themed variety show TV Total Turmspringen (TV Total Diving), it was first aired on 16 December 2004, in the TV total slot, on ProSieben and was founded by Stefan Raab and hosted by Sonya Kraus. Other hosts/reporters include Ingolf Lück (2004), Kai Pflaume (2005), Oliver Welke and Matthias Opdenhövel (2007, 09), Steven Gätjen (2011–12) and Olaf Schubert (2011–12 reporter).

It has been held every year since, with the exception of 2006. The eighth competition was on 24 November 2012 re-fought at the Olympic Pool, Munich.

The idea for the German show has been adopted by US network FOX and aired as a two-hour special, renamed Stars in Danger: The High Dive, on 9 January 2013. Fox's rival show is the American version of Splash, which airs on ABC since March 2013.

Both shows are similar in concept to the Netherlands-born Splash reality show format, which launched in August 2012 and is now produced in at least 10 other countries.

Contestants

Scoring chart

Red numbers indicate the lowest score for each week
Green numbers indicate the highest score for each week
 The diver won the competition.
 The diver received second place in the competition.
 The diver received third place in the competition.
 The diver received fourth, fifth , sixth and seventh place in the competition.
 The diver received first place that week, when audience scores were added in.
 The diver was in the bottom of the night and competed in the dive-off.
 The diver was eliminated that week.
 The diver did not dive that week.

Live show details

Heat 1 (9 June)

Judges' votes to save
 Pampita: 
 Maxiliano: 
 Miguel Ángel: 
 Mariana:

Ratings

References

2013 Argentine television series debuts
Argentine reality television series
Diving in Argentina
Telefe original programming